Arundoclaytonia is a genus of Brazilian plants in the grass family.

The only known species is Arundoclaytonia dissimilis, native to the States of Amazonas and Pará in Brazil.

See also
 List of Poaceae genera

References

Panicoideae
Endemic flora of Brazil
Grasses of Brazil
Flora of the Amazon
Flora of Pará
Environment of Amazonas (Brazilian state)
Monotypic Poaceae genera